The Seven Member Rule (House) / Five Member Rule (Senate) in the United States Congress is an important but seldom used statute that allows members from the legislature's oversight committees to compel offices within the executive branch to release information. This is a "checks and balances" measure to allow effective oversight.

Passed in 1928, the law states that

It was used by Republicans in 1994 during the S&L crisis investigations, and by Democrats in 2001 investigating the 2000 US Census. In 2017 House Democrats sued, invoking the law, to compel the General Services Administration to release documents relating to the lease of the government-owned Old Post Office Pavilion to the Trump International Hotel — the source of much controversy.

References

Members of the United States Congress
United States federal legislation